Prince of Wagram was a title of French nobility that was granted to Marshal Louis-Alexandre Berthier in 1809. It was created as a victory title by Emperor Napoleon I after the Battle of Wagram. Berthier had previously been granted the title of Sovereign Prince of Neuchâtel in 1806.

After the death of Berthier in 1815, the subsequent inheritors of the title lived at the Château de Grosbois, a large estate in Boissy-Saint-Léger, Val-de-Marne, southeast of Paris. Since the 4th Prince of Wagram had not yet married when he was killed in action during World War I, the title became extinct in 1918.

List of titleholders

 Louis-Alexandre Berthier, 1st Prince of Wagram (February 20, 1753 – June 1, 1815)
 Napoléon Alexandre Louis Joseph Berthier, 2nd Prince of Wagram (September 10, 1810 – February 10, 1887)
 Louis Philippe Marie Alexandre Berthier, 3rd Prince of Wagram (March 24, 1836 – July 15, 1911)
 Alexandre Louis Philippe Marie Berthier, 4th Prince of Wagram (July 20, 1883 – May 30, 1918)

External links
 Château de Grosbois, information on the Berthier de Wagram family and their estate –  not accessible 7 December 2007
 Marshal Berthier's son, archives of the New York Times, February 28, 1887

 
Lists of French nobility
Lists of princes
Noble titles created in 1809